In continuum mechanics, a compatible deformation (or strain) tensor field in a body is that unique tensor field that is obtained when the body is subjected to a continuous, single-valued, displacement field.  Compatibility is the study of the conditions under which such a displacement field can be guaranteed.  Compatibility conditions are particular cases of integrability conditions and were first derived for linear elasticity by Barré de Saint-Venant in 1864 and proved rigorously by Beltrami in 1886.

In the continuum description of a solid body we imagine the body to be composed of a set of infinitesimal volumes or material points.  Each volume is assumed to be connected to its neighbors without any gaps or overlaps.  Certain mathematical conditions have to be satisfied to ensure that gaps/overlaps do not develop when a continuum body is deformed.  A body that deforms without developing any gaps/overlaps is called a compatible body.  Compatibility conditions are mathematical conditions that determine whether a particular deformation will leave a body in a compatible state.

In the context of infinitesimal strain theory, these conditions are equivalent to stating that the displacements in a body can be obtained by integrating the strains.  Such an integration is possible if the Saint-Venant's tensor (or incompatibility tensor)  vanishes in a simply-connected body where  is the infinitesimal strain tensor and 

For finite deformations the compatibility conditions take the form

where  is the deformation gradient.

Compatibility conditions for infinitesimal strains 
The compatibility conditions in linear elasticity are obtained by observing that there are six strain-displacement relations that are functions of only three unknown displacements.  This suggests that the three displacements may be removed from the system of equations without loss of information.  The resulting expressions in terms of only the strains provide constraints on the possible forms of a strain field.

2-dimensions 
For two-dimensional, plane strain problems the strain-displacement relations are

The only displacement field that is allowed by a compatible plane strain field is a plane displacement field, i.e., .

3-dimensions 
In three dimensions, in addition to two more equations of the form seen for two dimensions, there are
three more equations of the form

Therefore, there are 34=81 partial differential equations, however due to symmetry conditions, this number reduces to  six different compatibility conditions.  We can write these conditions in index notation as

where  is the permutation symbol.  In direct tensor notation

The second-order tensor

is known as the incompatibility tensor, and is equivalent to the Saint-Venant compatibility tensor

Compatibility conditions for finite strains 
For solids in which the deformations are not required to be small, the compatibility conditions take the form

where  is the deformation gradient.  In terms of components with respect to a Cartesian coordinate system we can write these compatibility relations as

This condition is necessary if the deformation is to be continuous and derived from the mapping  (see Finite strain theory).   The same condition is also sufficient to ensure compatibility in a simply connected body.

Compatibility condition for the right Cauchy-Green deformation tensor 
The compatibility condition for the right Cauchy-Green deformation tensor can be expressed as

where  is the Christoffel symbol of the second kind.  The quantity  represents the mixed components of the Riemann-Christoffel curvature tensor.

The general compatibility problem 
The problem of compatibility in continuum mechanics involves the determination of allowable single-valued continuous fields on simply connected bodies.  More precisely, the problem may be stated in the following manner.

Consider the deformation of a body shown in Figure 1.  If we express all vectors in terms of the reference coordinate system , the displacement of a point in the body is given by

Also

What conditions on a given second-order tensor field  on a body are necessary and sufficient so that there exists a unique vector field  that satisfies

Necessary conditions
For the necessary conditions we assume that the field  exists and satisfies
. Then

Since changing the order of differentiation does not affect the result we have

Hence

From the well known identity for the curl of a tensor we get the necessary condition

Sufficient conditions

To prove that this condition is sufficient to guarantee existence of a compatible second-order tensor field, we start with the assumption that a field  exists such that
.

From Stokes' theorem, the integral of a second order tensor along a closed path is given by

Hence the integral is path independent and the compatibility condition is sufficient to ensure a unique  field, provided that the body is simply connected.

Compatibility of the deformation gradient 
The compatibility condition for the deformation gradient is obtained directly from the above proof by observing that 

Then the necessary and sufficient conditions for the existence of a compatible  field over a simply connected body are

Compatibility of infinitesimal strains
The compatibility problem for small strains can be stated as follows.

Given a symmetric second order tensor field  when is it possible to construct a vector field  such that

Necessary conditions
Suppose that there exists  such that the expression for  holds. Now

where

Therefore, in index notation,

If  is continuously differentiable we have . Hence,

In direct tensor notation

The above are necessary conditions. If  is the infinitesimal rotation vector then .

Sufficient conditions
Let us now assume that the condition  is satisfied in a portion of a body.  Is this condition sufficient to guarantee the existence of a continuous, single-valued displacement field ?

The first step in the process is to show that this condition implies that the infinitesimal rotation tensor  is uniquely defined.

Note that we need to know  a reference  to fix the rigid body rotation.

But from Stokes' theorem for a simply-connected body and the necessary condition for compatibility

Therefore, the field  is uniquely defined which implies that the infinitesimal rotation tensor  is also uniquely defined, provided the body is simply connected.

In the next step of the process we will consider the uniqueness of the displacement field .  As before we integrate the displacement gradient

From Stokes' theorem and using the relations  we have

Hence the displacement field  is also determined uniquely.  Hence the compatibility conditions are sufficient to guarantee the existence of a unique displacement field  in a simply-connected body.

Compatibility for Right Cauchy-Green Deformation field
The compatibility problem for the Right Cauchy-Green deformation field can be posed as follows.

 Problem: Let  be a positive definite symmetric tensor field defined on the reference configuration.  Under what conditions on  does there exist a deformed configuration marked by the position field  such that

Necessary conditions
Suppose that a field  exists that satisfies condition (1).  In terms of components with respect to a rectangular Cartesian basis

From finite strain theory we know that .  Hence we can write

For two symmetric second-order tensor field that are mapped one-to-one we also have the relation

Then, from the relation

we have

From finite strain theory we also have

Therefore,

and we have

Again, using the commutative nature of the order of differentiation, we have

or

After collecting terms we get

From the definition of  we observe that it is invertible and hence cannot be zero.  Therefore, 

We can show these are the mixed components of the Riemann-Christoffel curvature tensor. Therefore, the necessary conditions for -compatibility are that the Riemann-Christoffel curvature of the deformation is zero.

Sufficient conditions
The proof of sufficiency is a bit more involved.  We start with the assumption that

We have to show that there exist  and  such that

From a theorem by T.Y.Thomas  we know that the system of equations

has unique solutions  over simply connected domains if

Hence the assumed condition gives us a unique  that is  continuous.

Next consider the system of equations

We can show that the  also satisfy the property that

We can also show that the relation

implies that

See also 
 Saint-Venant's compatibility condition
 Linear elasticity
 Deformation (mechanics)
 Infinitesimal strain theory
 Finite strain theory
 Tensor derivative (continuum mechanics)
 Curvilinear coordinates

References

External links 
Amit Acharya's notes on compatibility on iMechanica
Plasticity by J. Lubliner, sec. 1.2.4 p. 35

Continuum mechanics
Elasticity (physics)